Jelle Galema (born 16 November 1992) is a Dutch field hockey player who plays as a forward for Oranje-Rood and the Dutch national team.

Club career
Galema started playing hockey at MEP in Boxtel and in 2009 he made the switch to Oranje Zwart. After Oranje Zwart merged in 2016 with EMHC he started playing for the newly formed club Oranje-Rood. In 2018, he moved to Den Bosch. After three seasons in Den Bosch he returned to Oranje-Rood in the summer of 2021.

International career
Galema's first call-up for the national team was for the 2012–13 Hockey World League Semifinal in Rotterdam. Galema was a part of the Dutch squad which won a bronze medal at the 2013 European Championship and a silver medal at the 2014 World Cup. After 2017, he was not called up for two years but he returned in the national team for the 2019 FIH Pro League. In June 2019, he was selected in the Netherlands squad for the 2019 EuroHockey Championship. They won the bronze medal by defeating Germany 4–0. In December 2020, he was dropped from the national team's training squad for the 2020 Summer Olympics.

References

External links

1992 births
Living people
People from Boxtel
Sportspeople from North Brabant
Dutch male field hockey players
Male field hockey forwards
2014 Men's Hockey World Cup players
Oranje Zwart players
HC Oranje-Rood players
HC Den Bosch players
Men's Hoofdklasse Hockey players